Marcel Charletoux (5 September 1913 – 11 September 1978) was a French rower. He competed in the men's eight event at the 1936 Summer Olympics.

References

1913 births
1978 deaths
French male rowers
Olympic rowers of France
Rowers at the 1936 Summer Olympics